Military Courage is a bronze statue, by Paul Dubois.

It is located in the West Garden, at Mount Vernon Place, Baltimore. 
The statue is a copy of the original, on the Cenotaph of General Jucault de Lamoricière in Nantes Cathedral, given by William Thompson Walters. 
A reduced example is in the Walters Art Museum.

See also
 1885 in art
List of public art in Baltimore

References

External links
http://monumentcity.net/2009/06/02/military-courage-statue-baltimore-md/

Outdoor sculptures in Baltimore
Landmarks in Baltimore
Monuments and memorials in Maryland
Mount Vernon, Baltimore
Tourist attractions in Baltimore
Bronze sculptures in Maryland
1885 sculptures
Statues in Maryland
1885 establishments in Maryland
Sculptures of men in Maryland